Inga Alsiņa (born 18 September 1979) is a Latvian actress.

She was born and raised in Cēsis and studied in the Cēsis Secondary school No.1 from 1985 until 1996. She also attended Valmiera Art college from 1993 until 1995.
In 1998 she started studies at the University of Latvia in department of Geography and Earth science however she left in 2000.
In 2003 she graduated Theatre department of Latvian Academy of Culture.
She is married with Kalvis Lasmanis, who is a businessman.

She has worked in the Valmiera Theatre since 2001. From 2004 until 2017 she worked in the New Riga Theatre. She has also taken part in several films.

In 2004 Inga received Lielais Kristaps award as best new actress of the year. She again received the prize in 2014 as a best actress of the year for her role in the Izlaiduma gads.

Filmography

References 

1979 births
People from Cēsis
Latvian stage actresses
Latvian film actresses
Living people
Latvian Academy of Culture alumni